The 1972 Sugar Bowl may refer to:

 1972 Sugar Bowl (January) - January 1, 1972, game between the Oklahoma Sooners and the Auburn Tigers
 1972 Sugar Bowl (December) - December 31, 1972, game between the Oklahoma Sooners and the Penn State Nittany Lions